This page shows a list of episodes for the web television series Chad Vader: Day Shift Manager, created by Aaron Yonda and Matt Sloan. The series was initially launched on Channel 101, but was cancelled after the first two episodes were released. Yonda and Sloan decided to continue the series on YouTube, as well as Blame Society Productions' independent website. It has become the signature show for Yonda and Sloan, who have since built on their success with additional shows and characters.

The show stars Chad Vader, the non-canonical brother of Star Wars villain Darth Vader; Chad is visually indistinguishable from Darth, save for his selfish and petty demeanor. The show follows Chad as he interacts with the customers and co-workers at Empire Market, where he is the day shift manager. Chad has a best friend in his "apprentice", Jeremy Wickstrom, while he is often at odds with night shift manager Clint Shermer and corporate owner Margaret McCall.

Chad Vader: Day Shift Manager has been the subject of great fanfare and acclaim, winning an Official Star Wars Fan Film Award. Because of his near-perfect impression of Darth Vader when voicing Chad, Matt Sloan was tapped by LucasArts to become Vader's new voice; Sloan voices Vader in the video games Empire at War: Forces of Corruption and Star Wars: The Force Unleashed. Chad Vader has also appeared on other web series, as well as Star Wars fan conventions.

Season 1: 2006-2007

Season 2: 2009

Season 3: 2010

Season 4: 2012

References

Chad Vader episodes
Chad